Amelia Bedelia is the first book in the popular Amelia Bedelia children's picture book series about a housekeeper who takes her instructions literally. It was written by Peggy Parish, illustrated by Fritz Siebel, and published by Harper and Row in 1963. The idea for the book came from a former housekeeper as well as Peggy's third-grade students at the Dalton School in Manhattan who tended to confuse vocabulary, often with comic results. Amelia Bedelia has been referenced for its use of language and portrayal of gender norms. Over 35 million copies of books in the series have been sold. 2013 marked the book's 50th anniversary and commemorated its popularity with the publication of a new line of Amelia Bedelia books.

Background 
The inspiration for the protagonist was likely a housekeeper at her grandparents home where Peggy Parish played as a child. In a 2013 interview, Herman Parish recalls how his aunt created Amelia Bedelia's character because of the need to target children of a certain age when they are both interested in reading and able to use their imagination without restraint. Herman Parish references this same idea in another interview about Amelia Bedelia, noting the importance of incorporating imagination and fun into books to engage children readers.

Summary
Amelia Bedelia is hired as a maid for the wealthy Mr. and Mrs. Rogers. Mrs. Rogers gives Amelia a list of chores to complete while the couple go out for the day. Despite meaning well, she cannot seem to do anything right because she misinterprets the Rogers' instructions—many of which are idioms. Amelia proceeds to take all the instructions literally: she dresses the chicken by fitting it into tiny clothes, draws the drapes by sketching them onto a piece of paper, dusts the furniture by covering it with cosmetic dusting powder, and puts the lights out by hanging lightbulbs on a clothesline.

Amelia's list of chores is copied below with her interpretations of each one:

 Change the towels in the green bathroom – she used scissors to cut and change the towels' appearance.
 Dust the furniture – she threw dusting powder onto the furniture (in her house "they un-dust the furniture").
 Draw the drapes when the sun comes in – she drew a picture of the drapes.
 Put the lights out when you finish in the living room – she took all the light bulbs out of their sockets and hung them on the clothesline.
 Measure two cups of rice – she poured rice into two coffee cups, stacked them, and measured them with a tape measure. She then dumped the rice back into the box.
 Trim the fat before you put the steak in the icebox – she decorated the steak by trimming lace and ribbons.
 Dress the chicken – she put little clothes onto the chicken.

When the couple returns home, Mrs. Rogers is bewildered that the chores have not been done in the way it was instructed and Amelia has wreaked havoc throughout their house. Mrs. Rogers is on the verge of firing Amelia when Mr. Rogers puts a bite of Amelia's lemon meringue pie into his wife's mouth. Mrs. Rogers finds it so delicious that she forgives Amelia and decides to continue to employ her and vows to write more explicit instructions in the future.

Analysis

Language 
Teaching guides incorporate Amelia Bedelia books into lessons on language – especially idioms – and reading comprehension. In Carol Wolchok's book The Reading Teacher, she outlines a lesson that teaches idioms to third graders with examples from Amelia Bedelia. School Media Activities Monthly published a lesson combining illustrations with instruction on figurative and literal language based on Amelia Bedelia. Examples of idiomatic language from Amelia Bedelia were also used in a study examining metalinguistic ability and whether or not it impacts a child's ability to determine meanings of words and/or phrases.

Feminist interpretations 
In an article in The New Yorker, Sarah Blackwood offers a feminist interpretation, arguing that Amelia Bedelia's absurd interpretations are a sort of rebellion that reflect the 1960s feminist movement. A 2021 study found that children's books can influence the ways in which children interpret gender stereotypes. A total of 247 books were read by adults and then given a rating on a scale of 5 in regards to its gender bias – Amelia Bedelia was found to be one of the books with the highest feminine-bias due to its portrayal of gender.

Publication 
Over 35 million copies of books in the Amelia Bedelia series have been sold. Holt Rinehart and Winston adapted this and several other books in the series for its I Can Read! line of beginning books. A 50th anniversary edition was published in 2013 which includes author's notes and archive photos. The first two chapter books in the new series written by Peggy's nephew, Herman Parish, were published to coincide with the original book's anniversary, focusing on the young Amelia Bedelia.

Reception 
An ABC News article commemorating the 50th anniversary of Amelia Bedelia's publication referred to Amelia as "possibly the most successful housemaid in the world". The recent line of Amelia Bedelia books were published on its 50th anniversary after requests from children readers and even other authors. HarperCollins credits Amelia Bedelia's popularity to the lead character's comic ways and the fact that readers of all ages have read Amelia Bedelia and continue reading it to this day.

References

External links
 Meet Amelia Bedelia at Harper Collins Children's
 Amelia Bedelia word search game at I Can Read!
 Amelia Bedelia trivia game at Kidsreads.com
 A Guide for Using Amelia Bedelia in the Classroom, created as a teacher's resource by Mary Bolte

Children's fiction books
1963 children's books
American picture books
American children's books
HarperCollins books
Learning to read